GTS may refer to:

Education 
 General Theological Seminary, in New York City
 Grace Theological Seminary, in Winona Lake, Indiana
 Great Torrington School, in Devon, England

Organisations
 Game Technology Solutions, a Sri Lankan game development studio
Game Theory Society, a society for the promotion of research, teaching and application of game theory
 Good Thinking Society, a British skeptical organisation
 Global Telecommunications System, the communication system for meteorological data

Transport 
 Gas Turbine Ship, used as a ship prefix
 Geelong Transit System, in Victoria, Australia
 The Granites Airport, IATA airport code "GTS"
 Gran Turismo Special, or Gran Turismo Spider, or Gran Turismo Sport, a grand tourer appellation used by several automobiles, including:
 Dodge Viper GTS
 Farboud GTS
 Ferrari 330 GTS
 Ferrari 365 GTS
 Holden Monaro GTS
 HSV GTS
 Lightning GTS
 Toyota 86 GTS
 Vespa GTS, a scooter manufactured by Piaggio under the Vespa brand

Other uses 
 GeForce2 GTS, a model of GPU marketed by Nvidia
 Geologic time scale, a system of chronological dating that relates geological strata to time
 Gilles de la Tourette syndrome, or Tourette's syndrome, a neurodevelopmental disorder characterised by involuntary movements and speech
 Global Telecommunications System, a global network for the transmission of meteorological data
 Global Trade Station, a location in Pokémon games
 GNU Triangulated Surface library, a library of algorithms for handling surface meshes
 Go to Sleep (wrestling), a professional wrestling attack
 Grand Touring Supreme, a category in the IMSA GT Championship
 Great Trigonometrical Survey, a geodetic survey of India
 Green Tobacco Sickness, a type of nicotine poisoning
 Greenwich Time Signal, a series of six short tones broadcast at one-second intervals by many BBC Radio stations
 GTS/BKN, a television channel in South Australia
 Giant tiny sex, fetish subculture slang for macrophilia
 Gran Turismo Sport, a video racing game released in 2017